Robert Laben (November 16, 1920 – August 7, 2005) was an American academic.

Laben was raised in Genesee County, New York on a dairy farm.   In 1948 he attended Cornell University.  In 1950 he was hired at UC Davis.  He is a Professor of Emeritus of Animal Sciences.  For 36 years he was a highly regarded teacher and active faculty member.  In addition he was a respected undergraduate advisor known for his open door policy and genuine concern for students.  For 17 years he served as the Master Advisor of Animal Science.  Laben retired in 1986 yet continued to remain active in the University.  He served as a member of Animal Science Departs Memorial Fund Committee which supports undergraduate student activities.  His Department also named an undergraduate scholarship after him and wife Dorothy.  He also throughout his lifetime was a generous contributor to funds supporting service.  He and his wife died on August 7, 2005, after their car got stuck on a remote desert road.

In his honor, a UC Davis residence hall was named after Laben during the 2006-2007 school year. Laben Hall stands in the South Tercero Residence Area.

==References==

1920 births
2005 deaths
University of California, Davis faculty
Cornell University College of Agriculture and Life Sciences alumni
University of Missouri alumni
People from Genesee County, New York
Place of death missing